Maritz & Young is an architectural firm in Missouri.

Some of their works are listed on the National Register of Historic Places.
Balmer & Weber Music House Co. Building, 1004 Olive St. St. Louis, Missouri, NRHP-listed
Westwood Country Club, clubhouse in Westwood, Missouri
One or more works in NRHP-listed Carrswold Historic District, Clayton, Missouri 
One or more works in NRHP-listed Wydown-Forsyth District, Clayton and St. Louis, Missouri
One of more works in NRHP-listed Brentmoor Park, Brentmoor and Forest Ridge District, Clayton, Missouri

References

Further reading
The Architecture of Maritz & Young: Exceptional Historic Homes of St. Louis, by Kevin Amsler and L. John Schott, University of Chicago Press

Architects from Missouri